Dennie Gordon is an American film and television director. Her directorial television credits include Party of Five, Sports Night, Ally McBeal, The Practice, Grounded for Life, The Loop, White Collar, Burn Notice, Hell on Wheels, Waco, The Office  and other series. She has also directed the feature films Joe Dirt, New York Minute and What a Girl Wants.

In 2000, Gordon won the DGA Award for DGA Award for Outstanding Directorial Achievement in Musical/Variety for episode of the HBO series, Tracey Takes On... starring Tracey Ullman. She is a graduate of Gustavus Adolphus College and the Yale School of Drama.

Filmography

Films

Television

References

External links
 
 

American television directors
American women film directors
Comedy film directors
American women television directors
Yale School of Drama alumni
Living people
People from Robbinsdale, Minnesota
Film directors from Minnesota
Year of birth missing (living people)
21st-century American women